Tortuga Island may refer to:

 Tortuga (Haiti), a Caribbean island that forms part of Haiti
 La Tortuga Island, Venezuela, an uninhabited island in the Caribbean Sea
 Tortuga Island, Baja California Sur, Mexico, a volcanic island in the Gulf of California
 Tortuga Island, Peru, a small island in Department of Ancash, Peru
 Dry Tortugas, a group of islands in the Florida Keys in the United States
 Dry Tortugas National Park, a national park consisting of Fort Jefferson and the Dry Tortugas
 Isla Tortuguero, an island in Costa Rica
 La Tortue, Saint Barthélemy, a small island in the French Caribbean

See also 
 Turtle Island (disambiguation)